Bilateral relations exist between Bahrain and Russia.

Soviet-era relations
The Soviet Union established diplomatic relations with Bahrain on 29 September 1990.

Russian Federation relations
Bahrain recognised the Russian Federation as the successor state of the Soviet Union on 28 December 1991, after the latter's dissolution. Russia has an embassy in Manama, and Bahrain has an embassy in Moscow.

Economic ties
In May 2007, the two countries announced that they will jointly set up a new financial institution known as the "Arab-Russian Bank" and will have its main headquarters in Bahrain.

State visits

In 2008, King of Bahrain Hamad ibn Isa Al Khalifah visited Moscow and met with the Russian President Dmitry Medvedev.

In late 2015, King Hamad bin Isa Al Khalifa visited President Vladimir Putin. He presented the Russian president with a sword of Damascus steel, while Putin gifted him a stallion. They also stated their commitment to finding a solution for the Syrian crisis and for having a stable Syria.

In December 2017 a Russian parliamentary delegation visited the kingdom and spoke to their Bahraini counterparts, affirming their commitment to increasing ties between the two countries on all levels.

See also 
Foreign relations of Bahrain 
Foreign relations of Russia
List of ambassadors of Russia to Bahrain

References

 
Bilateral relations of Russia
Russia